Viewfield is an impact crater in Saskatchewan, Canada.

The crater is not exposed at the surface.

References

Further reading 
 Gent, M. R., Kreis, L. K. and D. Gendzwill., The Maple Creek structure, southwestern Saskatchewan. Summary of Investigations 1992, Saskatchewan Geological Survey, Rep. 92–4, p 204–208. 1992
 Grieve, R. A. F., Kreis, K., Therriault,A.M.and P.B.Robertson., Impact structures in the Williston Basin. Meteoritics and Planetary Science, v 33, n 4, p A63-A64. 1998
 Meteorite crater tip-off to Saskatchewan oil trap. Oilweek, v. 23, n. 14, p. 10-11 (May22, 1972). 1972
 Sawatzky, H. B., Astroblemes in the Williston basin. Journal of the Canadian Society of Exploration Geophysicists, v. 10, pp. 23–38. 1975
 Sawatzky, H. B., Astroblemes in the Williston Basin (abstract). Fuels: A Geological Appraisal. A Saskatchewan Geological Society Symposium, Nov 7–8, 1974, Regina, Saskatchewan, p. 12. 1974
 Sawatzky, H. B., Viewfield - a producing crater? CSEG Journal, v. 8, n. 1, p. 22–40. 1972

External links 
 Aerial Exploration of the Viewfield crater

Impact craters of Saskatchewan
Triassic impact craters
Jurassic impact craters
Division No. 1, Saskatchewan